Hanston is a city in Hodgeman County, Kansas, United States.  As of the 2020 census, the population of the city was 259.

History
Hanston was originally called Marena, and under the latter name was laid out in 1878. It was renamed Hanston in 1902, taking its name from the local Hann family.

Hanston was a station and shipping point on the Atchison, Topeka and Santa Fe Railway.

Geography
Hanston is located at  (38.122954, −99.712525), along K-156 and the Kansas and Oklahoma Railroad.

Demographics

2010 census
As of the census of 2010, there were 206 people, 96 households, and 63 families residing in the city. The racial makeup of the city was 95.1% White, 2.4% from other races, and 2.4% from two or more races. Hispanic or Latino of any race were 9.7% of the population.

There were 96 households, of which 21.9% had children under the age of 18 living with them, 54.2% were married couples living together, 7.3% had a female householder with no husband present, 4.2% had a male householder with no wife present, and 34.4% were non-families. 32.3% of all households were made up of individuals, and 11.5% had someone living alone who was 65 years of age or older. The average household size was 2.15 and the average family size was 2.65.

The median age in the city was 50.1 years. 21.8% of residents were under the age of 18; 3.4% were between the ages of 18 and 24; 18% were from 25 to 44; 37.4% were from 45 to 64; and 19.4% were 65 years of age or older. The gender makeup of the city was 47.1% male and 52.9% female.

2000 census
As of the census of 2000, there were 259 people, 104 households, and 74 families residing in the city. The racial makeup of the city was 96.91% White, 0.39% African American, 1.54% Native American, and 1.16% from two or more races. Hispanic or Latino of any race were 3.47% of the population.

There were 104 households, out of which 32.7% had children under the age of 18 living with them, 62.5% were married couples living together, 5.8% had a female householder with no husband present, and 28.8% were non-families. 26.0% of all households were made up of individuals, and 16.3% had someone living alone who was 65 years of age or older. The average household size was 2.49 and the average family size was 3.03.

In the city, the population was spread out, with 27.0% under the age of 18, 6.6% from 18 to 24, 19.7% from 25 to 44, 27.8% from 45 to 64, and 18.9% who were 65 years of age or older. The median age was 42 years. For every 100 females, there were 94.7 males. For every 100 females age 18 and over, there were 87.1 males.

The median income for a household in the city was $38,125, and the median income for a family was $43,571. Males had a median income of $30,000 versus $18,750 for females. The per capita income for the city was $17,049. About 6.6% of families and 8.4% of the population were below the poverty line, including 7.4% of those under the age of eighteen and 9.6% of those 65 or over.

Education

Schools
The community is served by Jetmore USD 227 public school district. In 2011 it absorbed the former Hanston USD 228, which had dissolved. The district has two schools:
 Hodgeman County Elementary School
 Hodgeman County Middle/High School

USD 227 Hodgeman County High School is located in Jetmore. The Hodgeman County High School mascot is the Longhorns. Prior to school unification, the Hanston High School mascot was Hanston Elks.

The Hanston Elks won the following Kansas State Championships:
8-Man DII Football – 1989, 1990, 1999, 2001, 2002 and 2004
1A Boys Basketball – 1978, 1989, 2004 and 2005

Library
Hanston is served by the Hanston City Library.

References

Further reading

External links
 Hanston – Directory of Public Officials
 Hanston City Map, KDOT

Cities in Kansas
Cities in Hodgeman County, Kansas